Hefe may refer to:

 Hefe (born 1965), singer a.k.a. Aaron Abeyta
 The German word for yeast. It is used to differentiate between unfiltered and filtered wheat beer in Germany (Weissbier), the unfiltered version being called "Hefe-Weizen", which may colloquially in the USA be shortened to Hefe.